Joel Geddis is an American (former) musician, songwriter, record producer, and film composer, best known for his musical contributions to Nicki Minaj's debut album Pink Friday, which was certified triple-platinum and nominated for Best Rap Album at the 54th Annual Grammy Awards. In film music, his work includes soundtracks for Sparkle featuring Jordin Sparks and The Wicker Man starring Nicolas Cage. He was last reported working with Christina Milian in 2012.

References

Living people
Year of birth missing (living people)
American male songwriters
American record producers
American film score composers